"To Be Loved by You" is a song written by Gary Burr and Mike Reid, and recorded by American country music artist Wynonna. It was released in January 1996 as the first single from her album Revelations.  The song reached number one on the Billboard Hot Country Singles & Tracks (now Hot Country Songs) chart in April 1996.

Chart performance

Year-end charts

References 

1996 singles
1996 songs
Wynonna Judd songs
Songs written by Gary Burr
Songs written by Mike Reid (singer)
Song recordings produced by Tony Brown (record producer)
MCA Records singles
Curb Records singles